In geometry, a uniform 5-polytope is a five-dimensional uniform polytope. By definition, a uniform 5-polytope is vertex-transitive and constructed from uniform 4-polytope facets.

The complete set of convex uniform 5-polytopes has not been determined, but many can be made as Wythoff constructions from a small set of symmetry groups. These construction operations are represented by the permutations of rings of the Coxeter diagrams.

History of discovery 

Regular polytopes: (convex faces)
1852: Ludwig Schläfli proved in his manuscript Theorie der vielfachen Kontinuität that there are exactly 3 regular polytopes in 5 or more dimensions.
Convex semiregular polytopes: (Various definitions before Coxeter's uniform category)
1900: Thorold Gosset enumerated the list of nonprismatic semiregular convex polytopes with regular facets (convex regular 4-polytopes) in his publication On the Regular and Semi-Regular Figures in Space of n Dimensions.
Convex uniform polytopes:
1940-1988: The search was expanded systematically by H.S.M. Coxeter in his publication Regular and Semi-Regular Polytopes I, II, and III.
1966: Norman W. Johnson completed his  Ph.D. Dissertation under Coxeter, The Theory of Uniform Polytopes and Honeycombs, University of Toronto
 Non-convex uniform polytopes:
1966: Johnson describes two non-convex uniform antiprisms in 5-space in his dissertation.
2000-2023: Jonathan Bowers and other researchers search for other non-convex uniform 5-polytopes, with a current count of 1297 known uniform 5-polytopes outside infinite families (convex and non-convex), excluding the prisms of the uniform 4-polytopes. The list is not proven complete.

Regular 5-polytopes 

Regular 5-polytopes can be represented by the Schläfli symbol {p,q,r,s}, with s {p,q,r} 4-polytope facets around each face. There are exactly three such regular polytopes, all convex:

{3,3,3,3} - 5-simplex
{4,3,3,3} - 5-cube
{3,3,3,4} - 5-orthoplex

There are no nonconvex regular polytopes in 5 dimensions or above.

Convex uniform 5-polytopes 

There are 104 known convex uniform 5-polytopes, plus a number of infinite families of duoprism prisms, and polygon-polyhedron duoprisms. All except the grand antiprism prism are based on Wythoff constructions, reflection symmetry generated with Coxeter groups.

Symmetry of uniform 5-polytopes in four dimensions
The 5-simplex is the regular form in the A5 family. The 5-cube and 5-orthoplex are the regular forms in the B5 family. The bifurcating graph of the D5 family contains the 5-orthoplex, as well as a 5-demicube which is an alternated 5-cube.

Each reflective uniform 5-polytope can be constructed in one or more reflective point group in 5 dimensions by a Wythoff construction, represented by rings around permutations of nodes in a Coxeter diagram. Mirror hyperplanes can be grouped, as seen by colored nodes, separated by even-branches. Symmetry groups of the form [a,b,b,a], have an extended symmetry, [[a,b,b,a]], like [3,3,3,3], doubling the symmetry order. Uniform polytopes in these group with symmetric rings contain this extended symmetry.

If all mirrors of a given color are unringed (inactive) in a given uniform polytope, it will have a lower symmetry construction by removing all of the inactive mirrors. If all the nodes of a given color are ringed (active), an alternation operation can generate a new 5-polytope with chiral symmetry, shown as "empty" circled nodes", but the geometry is not generally adjustable to create uniform solutions.

Fundamental families

Uniform prisms

There are 5 finite categorical uniform prismatic families of polytopes based on the nonprismatic uniform 4-polytopes. There is one infinite family of 5-polytopes based on prisms of the uniform duoprisms {p}×{q}×{ }.

Uniform duoprisms

There are 3 categorical uniform duoprismatic families of polytopes based on Cartesian products of the uniform polyhedra and regular polygons: {q,r}×{p}.

Enumerating the convex uniform 5-polytopes 
 Simplex family: A5 [34]
 19 uniform 5-polytopes
 Hypercube/Orthoplex family: B5 [4,33]
 31 uniform 5-polytopes
 Demihypercube D5/E5 family: [32,1,1]
 23 uniform 5-polytopes (8 unique)
 Polychoral prisms:
 56 uniform 5-polytope (45 unique) constructions based on prismatic families: [3,3,3]×[ ], [4,3,3]×[ ], [5,3,3]×[ ], [31,1,1]×[ ].
 One non-Wythoffian - The grand antiprism prism is the only known non-Wythoffian convex uniform 5-polytope, constructed from two grand antiprisms connected by polyhedral prisms.

That brings the tally to: 19+31+8+45+1=104

In addition there are:
 Infinitely many uniform 5-polytope constructions based on duoprism prismatic families: [p]×[q]×[ ].
 Infinitely many uniform 5-polytope constructions based on duoprismatic families: [3,3]×[p], [4,3]×[p], [5,3]×[p].

The A5 family 

There are 19 forms based on all permutations of the Coxeter diagrams with one or more rings. (16+4-1 cases)

They are named by Norman Johnson from the Wythoff construction operations upon regular 5-simplex (hexateron).

The A5 family has symmetry of order 720 (6 factorial). 7 of the 19 figures, with symmetrically ringed Coxeter diagrams have doubled symmetry, order 1440.

The coordinates of uniform 5-polytopes with 5-simplex symmetry can be generated as permutations of simple integers in 6-space, all in hyperplanes with normal vector (1,1,1,1,1,1).

The B5 family 

The B5 family has symmetry of order 3840 (5!×25).

This family has 25−1=31 Wythoffian uniform polytopes generated by marking one or more nodes of the Coxeter diagram. Also added are 8 uniform polytopes generated as alternations with half the symmetry, which form a complete duplicate of the D5 family as ... = ..... (There are more alternations that are not listed because they produce only repetitions, as ... = .... and ... = .... These would give a complete duplication of the uniform 5-polytopes numbered 20 through 34 with symmetry broken in half.)

For simplicity it is divided into two subgroups, each with 12 forms, and 7 "middle" forms which equally belong in both.

The 5-cube family of 5-polytopes are given by the convex hulls of the base points listed in the following table, with all permutations of coordinates and sign taken. Each base point generates a distinct uniform 5-polytope. All coordinates correspond with uniform 5-polytopes of edge length 2.

The D5 family 

The D5 family has symmetry of order 1920 (5! x 24).

This family has 23 Wythoffian uniform polytopes, from 3×8-1 permutations of the D5 Coxeter diagram with one or more rings. 15 (2×8-1) are repeated from the B5 family and 8 are unique to this family, though even those 8 duplicate the alternations from the B5 family.

In the 15 repeats, both of the nodes terminating the length-1 branches are ringed, so the two kinds of  element are identical and the symmetry doubles: the relations are ... = .... and ... = ..., creating a complete duplication of the uniform 5-polytopes 20 through 34 above. The 8 new forms have one such node ringed and one not, with the relation ... = ... duplicating uniform 5-polytopes 51 through 58 above.

Uniform prismatic forms 

There are 5 finite categorical uniform prismatic families of polytopes based on the nonprismatic uniform 4-polytopes. For simplicity, most alternations are not shown.

A4 × A1 

This prismatic family has 9 forms:

The A1 x A4 family has symmetry of order 240 (2*5!).

B4 × A1 

This prismatic family has 16 forms. (Three are shared with [3,4,3]×[ ] family)

The A1×B4 family has symmetry of order 768 (254!).

The last three snubs can be realised with equal-length edges, but turn out nonuniform anyway because some of their 4-faces are not uniform 4-polytopes.

F4 × A1 

This prismatic family has 10 forms.

The A1 x F4 family has symmetry of order 2304 (2*1152). Three polytopes 85, 86 and 89 (green background) have double symmetry [[3,4,3],2], order 4608. The last one, snub 24-cell prism, (blue background) has [3+,4,3,2] symmetry, order 1152.

H4 × A1 

This prismatic family has 15 forms:

The A1 x H4 family has symmetry of order 28800 (2*14400).

Duoprism prisms 
Uniform duoprism prisms, {p}×{q}×{ }, form an infinite class for all integers p,q>2. {4}×{4}×{ } makes a lower symmetry form of the 5-cube.

Grand antiprism prism 

The grand antiprism prism is the only known convex non-Wythoffian uniform 5-polytope. It has 200 vertices, 1100 edges, 1940 faces (40 pentagons, 500 squares, 1400 triangles), 1360 cells (600 tetrahedra, 40 pentagonal antiprisms, 700 triangular prisms, 20 pentagonal prisms), and 322 hypercells (2 grand antiprisms , 20 pentagonal antiprism prisms , and 300 tetrahedral prisms ).

Notes on the Wythoff construction for the uniform 5-polytopes 

Construction of the reflective 5-dimensional uniform polytopes are done through a Wythoff construction process, and represented through a Coxeter diagram, where each node represents a mirror. Nodes are ringed to imply which mirrors are active. The full set of uniform polytopes generated are based on the unique permutations of ringed nodes. Uniform 5-polytopes are named in relation to the regular polytopes in each family. Some families have two regular constructors and thus may have two ways of naming them.

Here are the primary operators available for constructing and naming the uniform 5-polytopes.

The last operation, the snub, and more generally the alternation, are the operation that can create nonreflective forms. These are drawn with "hollow rings" at the nodes.

The prismatic forms and bifurcating graphs can use the same truncation indexing notation, but require an explicit numbering system on the nodes for clarity.

Regular and uniform honeycombs 

There are five fundamental affine Coxeter groups, and 13 prismatic groups that generate regular and uniform tessellations in Euclidean 4-space.

There are three regular honeycombs of Euclidean 4-space:
tesseractic honeycomb, with symbols {4,3,3,4},  = . There are 19 uniform honeycombs in this family.
 24-cell honeycomb, with symbols {3,4,3,3}, . There are 31 reflective uniform honeycombs in this family, and one alternated form.
 Truncated 24-cell honeycomb with symbols t{3,4,3,3}, 
 Snub 24-cell honeycomb, with symbols s{3,4,3,3},  and  constructed by four snub 24-cell, one 16-cell, and five 5-cells at each vertex.
 16-cell honeycomb, with symbols {3,3,4,3}, 

Other families that generate uniform honeycombs:
 There are 23 uniquely ringed forms, 8 new ones in the 16-cell honeycomb family. With symbols h{4,32,4} it is geometrically identical to the 16-cell honeycomb,  =  
 4-simplex honeycomb 
 Truncated 4-simplex honeycomb 
 Omnitruncated 4-simplex honeycomb 
 There are 9 uniquely ringed forms in the : [31,1,1,1]  family, two new ones, including the quarter tesseractic honeycomb,  = , and the bitruncated tesseractic honeycomb,  = .

Non-Wythoffian uniform tessellations in 4-space also exist by elongation (inserting layers), and gyration (rotating layers) from these reflective forms.

Regular and uniform hyperbolic honeycombs 
Hyperbolic compact groups

There are 5 compact hyperbolic Coxeter groups of rank 5, each generating uniform honeycombs in hyperbolic 4-space as permutations of rings of the Coxeter diagrams.

There are 5 regular compact convex hyperbolic honeycombs in H4 space:

There are also 4 regular compact hyperbolic star-honeycombs in H4 space:

Hyperbolic paracompact groupsThere are 9 paracompact hyperbolic Coxeter groups of rank 5, each generating uniform honeycombs in 4-space as permutations of rings of the Coxeter diagrams. Paracompact groups generate honeycombs with infinite facets or vertex figures.

Notes

 References 
 T. Gosset: On the Regular and Semi-Regular Figures in Space of n Dimensions, Messenger of Mathematics, Macmillan, 1900 (3 regular and one semiregular 4-polytope)
 A. Boole Stott: Geometrical deduction of semiregular from regular polytopes and space fillings, Verhandelingen of the Koninklijke academy van Wetenschappen width unit Amsterdam, Eerste Sectie 11,1, Amsterdam, 1910
 H.S.M. Coxeter: 
 H.S.M. Coxeter, Regular Polytopes, 3rd Edition, Dover New York, 1973 (p. 297 Fundamental regions for irreducible groups generated by reflections, Spherical and Euclidean)
 H.S.M. Coxeter, The Beauty of Geometry: Twelve Essays (Chapter 10: Regular honeycombs in hyperbolic space, Summary tables IV p213)
 Kaleidoscopes Selected Writings of H.S.M. Coxeter', edited by F. Arthur Sherk, Peter McMullen, Anthony C. Thompson, Asia Ivic Weiss, Wiley-Interscience Publication, 1995,  
 (Paper 22) H.S.M. Coxeter, Regular and Semi Regular Polytopes I, [Math. Zeit. 46 (1940) 380-407, MR 2,10]
 (Paper 23) H.S.M. Coxeter, Regular and Semi-Regular Polytopes II, [Math. Zeit. 188 (1985) 559-591] (p. 287 5D Euclidean groups, p. 298 Four-dimensionsal honeycombs)
 (Paper 24) H.S.M. Coxeter, Regular and Semi-Regular Polytopes III, [Math. Zeit. 200 (1988) 3-45]
 N.W. Johnson: The Theory of Uniform Polytopes and Honeycombs, Ph.D. Dissertation, University of Toronto, 1966
 James E. Humphreys, Reflection Groups and Coxeter Groups'', Cambridge studies in advanced mathematics, 29 (1990) (Page 141, 6.9 List of hyperbolic Coxeter groups, figure 2)

External links 
  – includes nonconvex forms as well as the duplicate constructions from the B5 and D5 families

5-polytopes

eo:5-hiperpluredro